Zamfara attack may refer to:

Zamfara kidnapping, in February 2021
Zurmi massacre, in June 2021
2022 Zamfara massacres, in January 2022